Neolithocolletis nsengai is a moth of the family Gracillariidae. It is found in the Democratic Republic of Congo (Bas-Congo province) in primary rain forest.

The forewing ground colour is golden ochreous with black markings without margins. The hindwings are pale grey with a long and dense dark grey fringe gradually shortening towards the apex. Adults are on wing from early April to late May.

The larvae feed as leaf miners on Dalbergia hostilis. The mine has the form of an oblong whitish or pale beige blotch-mine which is found on the base of the leaflet on the underside of the leaf. Pupation takes place inside the mine within a circular white cocoon.

Etymology
The species is named in honour of Laurent Nsenga, the general managing director of the Luki-Mayumbe nature reserve and WWF.

References

Moths described in 2012
Lithocolletinae
Insects of the Democratic Republic of the Congo
Moths of Africa
Endemic fauna of the Democratic Republic of the Congo

Leaf miners
Taxa named by Jurate de Prins